Juan de Pimentel was an early governor of Venezuela Province, the Venezuela Province being one of the Spanish Empire. Under his governorship (1576 - 1583) the capital of the Province was moved from El Tocuyo to Caracas. He was a Knight of the Order of Santiago.

Knights of Santiago
Royal Governors of Venezuela